The siege of Jinji, (September 1690–8 January 1698), began when the Mughal Emperor Aurangzeb appointed Zulfiqar Ali Khan as the Nawab of the Carnatic and dispatched him to besiege and capture Jinji Fort, which had been sacked and captured by Maratha Empire troops led by Rajaram, they had also ambushed and killed about 300 Mughal Sowars in the Carnatic. The Mughal Emperor Aurangzeb then ordered Ghazi ud-Din Khan Feroze Jung I to protect the supply routes leading to Jinji Fort and to support and provide reinforcements to Zulfiqar Ali Khan when needed.

Rani Mangammal of the  Madurai Nayak dynasty played a key role of assisting Zulfiqar Ali Khan.

The siege of Jinji, was also the longest siege by any single Mughal Army in recorded history, it lasted for a lingering 8 years.

Background
Jinji Fort itself was under the control of the Adil Shahis of Bijapur since the year 1649. Until in the year 1677, Sivaji, routed the Bijapur forces and captured Jinji Fort. The fort itself was chosen as a hideout for the Maratha leader Rajaram and his allies Santaji Ghorpade and Dhanaji Jadhav.

Outraged by the deaths of the Mughal Sowars in the region the Mughal Emperor Aurangzeb dispatched Zulfiqar Ali Khan to besiege and capture the massive Jinji Fort.

But besieging the fort was no easy task.  It enclosed an area of 7 km2 (2.7 sq mi), and its walls were 30 ft high and 66 ft thick. It is elevated 800 ft (240 m) high, and protected by an 80 feet (24 m) wide moat. There were three very important hills within the fort and a large pond containing fresh water.

Encirclement of Jinji Fort
Immediately after encircling the fort in the year 1690, with his Mughal Sowars and Zamburak, Zulfiqar Ali Khan placed Swarup Singh and young Mehboob Khan (a Tamil Muslim nicknamed Maavuthukaran) in command of the Sepoys. Daud Khan was appointed Mir Atish or lead gunner of 60 cannons placed at various locations. Fatah Muhammad was the lead commander of the Rocket artillery consisting of 50 men. Muslim Mappila and Tamils were recruited and good relations were established with Ali Raja Ali II.

Zulfiqar Ali Khan then ordered the Maratha to surrender but Rajaram refused and the bombardments began but with little success. Desperately searching for a quick victory Zulfiqar Ali Khan made all efforts to gather men, ammunition and money for a successful war with them. He even allied himself with Fort St. George's English Governor Elihu Yale.

In the coming years Zulfiqar Ali Khan would attempt to breach the walls with limited resources he managed to protect the trade routes and make contact with Ghazi ud-Din Khan Feroze Jung I on many occasions. He defended nearby land owners, and led four massive assaults upon the Marathas inside the fort.  However, most of his focus was towards the vicinity of the fort and he continuously expected and correctly predicted Maratha ambushes instead of besieging the fort itself.

Zulfikhar Ali Khan was briefly joined by Aurangzeb's son Prince Muhammad Kam Baksh. On one occasion when the Mughal encampments around Jinji fort were surrounded by the Maratha rebels, actually decided to defect his plans were foiled and was put to chains and imprisoned in a ditch which was covered by a tent by Zulfikhar Ali Khan, who managed to expel the roving Marathas with Matchlocks. Zulfikhar Ali Khan then wrote a letter informing the Mughal Emperor of his son's betrayal, Aurangzeb then sent his trusted vizier Asad Khan to retrieve Prince Muhammad Kam Baksh. Asad Khan arrived with the finest weapons, carriages and thousands of reinforcements. When Prince Muhammad Kam Baksh, was brought in chains before Aurangzeb, the Mughal Emperor almost had him beheaded, but Aurangzeb was deterred by the pleas of his own daughter Zinat-un-nissa.

Queen Mangammal had realized that the renegade Rajaram had entrenched himself within Jinji and had been bent upon attacking Thanjavur and Madurai if the Mughal Army was to withdraw. Mangammal soon recognized Aurangzeb as her suzerain and began to assist Zulfikhar Ali Khan in attacking the fort.

Zulfikhar Ali Khan then set up a base in Wandiwash. In 1697 Zulfikhar Ali Khan led 18,000 men from his camp (8000 Sowars and 10,000 Sepoys) in order to fight an assembling Maratha force in Thanjavur sent by Shivaji II and Ramchandra Pant Amatya and possibly aided by the Madurai Nayaks, consisting of over 40,000 men, with the objective to relieve the siege of Jinji Fort and continue their hostilities against the Mughal Empire. Zulfikhar Ali Khan and his considerably smaller battalion then defeated the ill-equipped Maratha force and routed them from Thanjavur.

Because Zulfikhar Ali Khan did not often receive assistance and supplies from the Mughals he began to forage the countryside in order to recover his losses. In 1697 Rajaram offered to negotiate, but Aurangzeb ordered Zulfikhar Ali Khan to initiate an all-out assault. Zulfikhar Ali Khan returned he made efforts to hire European gunners and then led his final fourth assault into Jinji Fort in the year 1698. Forced into action, the Mughal Army battered the walls with cannon fire, which eventually allowed them to scale the walls and capture the lower citadels, which were armed with cannons that bombarded the higher citadel. After heavy bombardments the Mughals captured the higher citadel. Zulfikhar Ali Khan captured four of Rajaram's wives, three sons and two daughters, while Rajaram himself fled.

Aftermath

According to Mughal accounts Zulfikhar Ali Khan named Jinji Fort, "Nusratgarh" after its capture, but the condemned Maratha leader Rajaram had somehow escaped earlier on during the siege, causing much dismay for Zulfikhar Ali Khan. However, the Mughal rule at Jinji eventually paved the way to the establishment of the Nawab of the Carnatic and the Sultanate of Mysore.

But according to Hindu accounts, it was due to the efforts of Swarup Singh of Bundela, that the Mughals were successful. The Mughal Emperor Aurangazeb, himself granted Swarup Singh a position of Mansabdar of 2,500 and gave him total command and administration of Jinji Fort in 1700 AD. But after Sawrup Singh died of old age in 1714, his newly arriving son De Singh was given command according to an official Firman by the Mughal Emperor Jahandar Shah. This action was considered outrageous to Muhammed Saadatullah Khan I who personally marched to Jinji Fort with 18,000 men and killed De Singh and declared himself the administrator of Jinji Fort.

References

Jinji
Jinji
History of Tamil Nadu
1690s in India
1690 in India
1698 in India
Jinji